Lokanatha may refer to:
 Lokanatha, one of the thousand names of Shiva
 Lokanatha Goswami, Gaudiya Vaishnava saint
 Lokanatha (Salvatore Cioffi), Italian Buddhist missionary
 An emanation or avatar of the Buddhist bodhisattva Avalokiteśvara